Wienand is a German language surname. It stems from a male given name with the components win="friend" and nant="bold". Notable people with the name include:

George Wienand (1910–1993), English Football League player
Ralf Wienand (born 1963), West German sprint canoer
Wolfgang Wienand (born 1972), former German fencer

German-language surnames
Surnames from given names